The Citroën Saxo was a supermini produced by the French manufacturer Citroën from 1996 to 2004. It was sold in Japan as the Citroën Chanson, because Honda had registered the "Saxo" name. As a badge engineered variant of the Peugeot 106 (which itself was a development of the Citroën AX), the major difference being interiors and body panels. Production ended in 2004, when it was replaced with the Citroën C2 and Citroën C3.

Overview

Engines and performance
All engines were from the PSA TU engine series that powered the Peugeot 205 from 1988 and the Citroën AX, and had their roots before that with the OHC PSA X engine various other PSA cars used, such as the Citroën Visa, Peugeot 104 and early Peugeot 205. The range included five petrol engines and one diesel engine, all naturally aspirated.

Although the quoted power outputs are low in comparison to modern small hatchbacks, or even to other hatchbacks of the time, the kerb weight was generally very low, with even the range-topping VTS having a kerb weight of just , with other smaller engine models (except the diesel) being around 100 kg lighter than this.

This meant a high power to weight ratio resulting in decent acceleration and made the car suitable for city driving. Aside from the VTS which had 16 valves, all engines were the older SOHC units which meant relatively low city MPG figures. Even the popular 1.1i engine would struggle to achieve more than 35 to 40mpg in town when driven carefully.

The real world consumption between the smaller engines and the nippy 1.4i Westcoast/Furio variant was hardly noticeable, however the insurance premiums were. The early 1.0i was quite under powered, with the 1.1i being considered much better, since it was nearly 200cc larger and had roughly 30% more torque.

There were three sport models of the Saxo:

 The Westcoast, later replaced by the Furio which featured a 1.4I 8V  engine with a top speed of 175 km/h (109 mph), and a 0-62.5 mph (0–100 km/h) time of 11.2 seconds.
 The VTR MK1 (1997–1999) featured a fuel injected, 1.6-liter 8-valve  engine with a top speed of 187 km/h (116 mph) and a 0-62.5 mph (0–100 km/h) time of 10.0 seconds. The VTR MK2 (1999–2003) featured a 1.6I 8V  engine with a top speed of 193 km/h (120 mph) and a 0-62.5 mph (0–100 km/h) time of 9.4 seconds.
 The VTS 16V featured a 1.6I  engine with a top speed of 205 km/h (127 mph), and a 0 to 60 mph time of 7.8 seconds. The VTS MK1 (1997–1999) and MK2 (1999–2003) shared similar performance, although the MK2 was slightly slower due to it being marginally heavier.
These models included  vented front brake discs, with the VTR and VTS also having rear brake discs (solid  discs). Also, a different style of control arms and struts was used for the suspension.

In addition, all the sports models featured a unique bodykit to the other models, commonly known as the "VT" bodykit.

In 1997 the Saxo's three speed automatic gearbox was combined with the 1.6i 8V  engine which was available on the Saxo SX and VSX. Then, in the end of 1997, the 1.6i automatic was replaced with a 1.4i  engine.

Citroën carried on using the 1.4i engine on the facelift Saxo Automatic in 1999. Due to the C3 having a 1.4i automatic gearbox, the Saxo Automatic came to an end in March 2002, whilst the manual models were still sold right up to the end of 2003.

 1.0 L (954 cc) TU9 I4,  and 
 1.1 L (1124 cc) TU1 I4,  and 
 1.4 L (1360 cc) TU3 I4,  and 
 1.5 L (1527 cc) TUD5 diesel I4,  and 
 1.6 L (1587 cc) TU5 I4,  and 
 1.6 L (1587 cc) TU5 I4,  and

Interior and equipment

The equipment list was generally sparse, with budget models having drivers airbag, seat belt pre tensioners, cassette player, heated rear screen and tinted windows, and early Mark Ones with keypad immobilisers and a clock in place of a tachometer and three stud wheels, much like the AX. Further up the list sunroofs, PAS, Electric windows, ultrasonic alarm, passenger airbag, CD player, tachometer, front fog lights, bodykits, colour coded mirror caps and alloy wheels were added, to name a few.

Although MK2 Saxos were generally better equipped than their older counterparts, the interiors were still dated in comparison to other small hatchbacks of the time, such as the Vauxhall Corsa, with many of the center console controls originating from the older model of the Citroën AX.

The 1.6L VTR and VTS Saxos were the best equipped, with both gaining rear disc brakes as opposed to drum brakes, and ABS as standard for the VTS and an optional extra on all other 1.6-liter models.

Few special models were released throughout the Saxo's life, most notably the "Open Scandal", a Saxo with a full length sliding canvas roof. Other special editions added certain extras to the lower end model, such as sunroofs or PAS. Notable models are the Westcoast up to 1999 and the Furio to 2003, as they incorporated the standard Saxo bodykit found on the VTR and VTS with a more insurance friendly 1.4-liter engine. The Westcoast is not to be confused with the Eastcoast, which was only available in the 1.0L and later 1.1L engines. The Eastcoast also did not incorporate the "VT" bodykit.

Air conditioning was never an option on right hand drive Saxos because the blower motor was mounted in the bulk head on the driver's side. As a result, there was insufficient space available to accommodate the evaporator, except by first ducting the air flow to the passenger's side and then at the expense of the glove box.

Although an after market kit was available that did exactly this, the resultant pressure loss made the system noisy and ineffective. The blower motor could also not be easily relocated, since the windscreen wiper motor was mounted in the passenger's side space.

In September 1999, the Saxo received a style makeover, commonly branded as a Mark II, with the major differences being more modern styled headlights, bonnets and grilles to replace the square style on the MK1 and multipoint injection replacing the single point on the 1.1-liter engines. In September 2000, it was a Euro NCAP sufferer of poor results, along with its twin, the 106.

Power steering became standard on all but the very basic models. More subtle changes were alterations to the rear lights (the indicator sections are more "white") and the engine control unit moved from a single plug to three plugs. The old three-stud wheel layout, as used on the Citroën AX, was also dropped. There was also a minor facelift, during the first phase of the car's production, in line with the then current releases by Citroën, moving towards a rounder look.

While the exterior was markedly altered, little changed inside the vehicle. The dashboard and glovebox arrangement remained the same with the possibility of installing a passenger-side airbag in some high range models.

By 2003, some buyers were more attracted to the spacious, and practical five-door C3. However, the 1.6 VTR and VTS models remained popular. The Saxo finally finished production in September 2003, when the three-door C2 was launched. Its twin, the Peugeot 106, also ceased production at this time. By the end of the Saxo's production life, its design was seven years old.

Drag coefficient
In addition its frontal area is 1.83 m2, giving it a CdA ft² of 6.68.

See also
Peugeot 106

References

External links

2000s cars
Cars introduced in 1996
Saxo
City cars
Euro NCAP superminis
Front-wheel-drive vehicles
Hot hatches